Meichuan may refer to:

 Meichuan, a town in Min County, Dingxi, Gansu, China
 Meichuan, a town in Wuxue, Huanggang, Hubei, China